Ritz Metro is a Mexican biscuit launched in 2007, and now discontinued.

References 
 http://www.merca20.com/?p=8962 

Kraft Foods brands